Federico Lardi (born July 27, 1985) is a Swiss former professional ice hockey defenceman. He last played with the SCL Tigers of the Swiss National League (NL).

Lardi made his NLA debut playing with HC Davos during the 2003–04 season.

Career statistics

References

External links

1985 births
Living people
HC Davos players
Lausanne HC players
SCL Tigers players
Swiss ice hockey defencemen
People from Poschiavo
EHC Visp players
Sportspeople from Graubünden